Reccopolis, located near the tiny modern village of Zorita de los Canes in the province of Guadalajara, Castile-La Mancha, Spain, is an archaeological site of one of at least four cities founded in Hispania by the Visigoths. It is one of only two cities in Western Europe known to have been founded between the fifth and eighth centuries.

Historical information
Reccopolis was founded in the year 578. The date is given in chronicle of John of Biclaro: Luivigildus rex extinctis undique tyrannis, et pervasoribus Hispaniae superatis sortitus requiem propiam cum plebe resedit civitatem in Celtiberia ex nomine filii condidit, quae Recopolis nuncupatur: quam miro opere et in moenibus et suburbanis adornans privilegia populo novae Urbis instituit. A cache of coins was discovered in the city's palace, fixing the date of construction between 580–83. Coin variety indicated cultural reach, with gold coins of the Merovingian series, Suevic coins from Galicia and of Justinian II, as well as from Visigothic Hispania itself. Reccopolis had an active mint, coins from which have been found dating to the reign of Wittiza, in the early eighth century.

The city was named by the Visigothic king Liuvigild to honor his son Reccared I and to serve as Reccared's seat as co-king in the Visigothic province of Celtiberia, to the west of Carpetania, where the main capital, Toledo, lay. As a post-Roman royal foundation the city's only European rival in the sixth century was Ravenna. In the eighth century the Visigoths at Reccopolis welcomed Muslim over-lordship in return for Muslim protection. The Moors conserved the city as Madinät Raqquba and though they reused building materials to construct a fortification on a hill facing the city, the city declined and was burned, looted, razed, and incrementally abandoned in the tenth century. It lay forgotten until the twentieth century.

Today Reccopolis is a large field of ruins in the Cerro de la Olíva. There are plans to protect the partially excavated site as Parque Arqueológico Recópolis. In 2007, the Museo Arqueológico Regional in Alcalá de Henares mounted an exhibition called "Recópolis: un paseo por la ciudad Visigoda" and published an accompanying catalogue.

Design

Archaeological excavations at Reccopolis have revealed traces of city walls with towers every thirty metres, an aqueduct, commercial and residential quarters covering 30 hectares, several markets, and a mint. Its urban core was centered on a palace with administrative as well as royal functions, connected with a palatine chapel, an arrangement that has Byzantine parallels. On the western wall, a single entrance gate provided access. Within this a second gate formed an entrance to an "upper city" of the palace compound and its attached chapel. The "lower city" outside contained lodgings for the ordinary citizens, commercial districts and a barracks.

The palace was two stories tall. The lower story was a single space, perhaps a granary, with column bases supporting the story above. Flooring remnants indicate the second story may have been the piano nobile. The roofs were tiled, as they had been in Roman times. The palace chapel is possibly the last of the Visigothic Arian churches, but it was overlaid by the Romanesque hermitage of Nuestra Señora de Recatel, which was constructed on the ruined site. It was of basilica construction, with a central nave separated by solid walls from the flanking naves. These exited into the transept, but did not communicate directly with the nave. Its hemispherical apse was rectangular in outer appearance. A deep narthex was entered by a single central door.

References

External links
 
 Recópolis

Visigothic archaeological sites in Spain
Gothic cities and towns
Populated places established in the 6th century
Former populated places in Spain
578 establishments
6th century in the Visigothic Kingdom
7th century in the Visigothic Kingdom
8th century in the Visigothic Kingdom
8th century in Al-Andalus
9th-century disestablishments in Europe
Archaeological sites in Castilla–La Mancha
Buildings and structures in the Province of Guadalajara